Egon T. Lánský (born Egon Löwy; 23 July 1934 – 25 November 2013) was a Czech politician for the Czech Social Democratic Party (CSDP), journalist, political commentator, spokesperson and columnist.

Career

In August 1968, he went to Sweden, where he initially worked in various paraprofessionals before he learned Swedish.  In the spring of 1968, he became one of the founding members of the Club of Committed Non-Party Members (CCNP). In 1981, he concluded the study of history and political science at Lund University, in Lund.

He also worked as a conservative political commentator for a Swedish newspaper and for a Czechoslovakian newsroom from 1981 to 1984, and later as a commentator on Radio Free Europe in Munich, Germany. He was also active in various movements in Israel, where he co-founded a committee of solidarity with Eastern Europe.

In November 1989, Lánský returned to Czechoslovakia, became the spokesman for the Foreign Ministry and the then Czechoslovak ambassador to the Permanent Mission at the Council of Europe in Strasbourg, and after the split of Czechoslovakia, he asked for Czech citizenship and worked as a consultant and journalist before, in 1995, he became the spokesperson Miloš Zeman, the former chairman CSDP.

Also, in 1995, Lánský appeared as a rabbi in the comedy-drama film Golet v údolí.

In the elections of 1996, he was elected Děčín District on the ticket of the Social Democrats Senator, a position he held until the end of the legislative period of 2002. Lánský said:

In July 1998, he became deputy chairman of Zeman's government and ministries in charge of coordinating foreign, interior and defense, in particular, but accession negotiations with the European Union. He resigned in late November 1999, as already the second member of this government, and said health reasons. The political opponents, which should also include Miloš Zeman, bandied about the slowness of the accession negotiations and unacknowledged account in Austria.

Personal life and death
Egon Lánský was born as Egon Löwy on 23 July 1934 in Trenčín, Czechoslovakia (now Slovakia), the son of Jewish doctors. His father fled to England in 1939, following the German occupation of Czechoslovakia.

After surviving a concentration camp during World War II, he returned to Trenčín, changed his surname to Lánský and kept his religion. Lánský was fluent in Czech, English, Slovak and Swedish.

Egon Lánský died following a long-term illness on 25 November 2013, aged 79, at a Prague hospital.

References

External links

1934 births
2013 deaths
People from Trenčín
Jewish concentration camp survivors
Czech Jews
Czech expatriates in Germany
Czech expatriates in Sweden
Jewish Czech politicians
Czech journalists
Political commentators
Czech columnists
Spokespersons
Czech Social Democratic Party Senators